Ioannis Kigalas,, (1622 – c. 5 November 1687) was a Greek Cypriot scholar and professor of Philosophy and Logic who was largely active in Padua and Venice in the 17th-century Italian Renaissance.

Biography 

Ioannis Kigalas was a Greek born in the city of Nicosia on the island of Cyprus, then in the Ottoman Empire in 1622. His father was Matthaios. Ioannis moved to Italy in his youth to pursue his education. From 1635 he was enrolled in the college of Saint Athanasios in Rome where he was soon joined by his brothers Dimtrios and Ieronymos who studied at the same college. In 1642 he graduated as Doctor of Philosophy and Theology and was employed as a teacher of the Greek language from 1642 to 1650. Kigalas soon moved to Venice where he briefly practiced law. He later moved to Padova where in 1666 he was appointed Professor of Philosophy and Logic at the University. He continued to work at the University of Padova gradually rising to higher positions. Kigalas was selected as Professor to the second chair of Philosophy in 1678 and by 1687 he was appointed Professor to the first chair of Philosophy. He wrote several epigrams in Greek. Several of his works have survived in books of other scholars. Kigalas died on 5 November 1687.

References

See also
Greek scholars in the Renaissance

1622 births
1687 deaths
People from Nicosia
Cypriot academics
Greek Renaissance humanists
Philosophy academics
17th-century Greek physicians
17th-century Greek scientists
17th-century Greek philosophers
Academic staff of the University of Padua